Staden is a municipality located in the Belgian province of West Flanders.

Staden may also refer to:

Places
 Staden, Derbyshire, England
 Van Stadens River, South African river
 Van Stadens Bridge, a bridge over Van Stadens River
 Freetown Christiania in Copenhagen, Denmark, commonly referred to by the nickname Staden

People
 Alexandra Staden, British actress
 Hans Staden (1525–1579), 16th-century German soldier, author of a famous captivity narrative
 Heinrich von Staden (author) (born 1542), 16th-century German spy in Russia
 Heinrich von Staden (historian) (born 1939), South African historian and classical scholar
 Johann Staden (1581–1634), 17th-century German composer
 Rudi von Staden, co-founder of Ungana-Afrika
 Sigmund Theophil Staden (1607–1655), son of Johann Staden

Other
 Staden Package, open source software for DNA sequence assembly